Traulia is a genus of grasshoppers in the subfamily Catantopinae; it was considered typical of tribe Trauliini, but is now placed in the tribe Mesambriini.  A majority of species found in South-East Asia.

Species
The Orthoptera Species File lists:

 Traulia affinis (Haan, 1842)
 Traulia angustipennis Bi, 1986
 Traulia annandalei Bolívar, 1917
 Traulia antennata Bolívar, 1917
 Traulia aphanea Willemse, 1928
 Traulia aurora Willemse, 1921
 Traulia azureipennis (Serville, 1838)
 Traulia bidentata Willemse, 1957
 Traulia bimaculata Willemse, 1932
 Traulia borneensis Willemse, 1921
 Traulia brachypeza Bi, 1986
 Traulia brevipennis Zheng, Ma & Li, 1994
 Traulia brunneri Bolívar, 1917
 Traulia elegans Willemse, 1921
 Traulia flavoannulata (Stål, 1861)type species (as Acridium flavo-annulatum Stål), locality Java.
 Traulia gaoligongshanensis Zheng & Mao, 1996
 Traulia grossa Ramme, 1941
 Traulia haani Willemse, 1921
 Traulia hainanensis Liu & Li, 1995
 Traulia hosei Willemse, 1935
 Traulia hyalinala Zheng & Huo, 1999
 Traulia incompleta Willemse, 1921
 Traulia insularis Willemse, 1928
 Traulia javana Ramme, 1941
 Traulia jiulianshanensis Xiangyu, Wang & Liu, 1997
 Traulia kukenthali Ramme, 1941
 Traulia lineata Brunner von Wattenwyl, 1898
 Traulia lofaoshana Tinkham, 1940
 Traulia media Willemse, 1935
 Traulia melli Ramme, 1941
 Traulia mindanaensis Ramme, 1941
 Traulia minuta Huang & Xia, 1985
 Traulia nigrifurcula Zheng & Jiang, 2002
 Traulia nigritibialis Bi, 1986
 Traulia orchotibialis Liang & Zheng, 1986
 Traulia orientalis Ramme, 1941
 Traulia ornata Shiraki, 1910
 Traulia palawana Willemse, 1935
 Traulia philippina Bolívar, 1917
 Traulia pictilis Stål, 1877
 Traulia pumila Willemse, 1932
 Traulia rosea Willemse, 1921
 Traulia sanguinipes Stål, 1878
 Traulia stali Bolívar, 1917
 Traulia stigmatica Bolívar, 1898
 Traulia sumatrensis Bolívar, 1898
 Traulia superba Willemse, 1930
 Traulia szetschuanensis Ramme, 1941
 Traulia tibialis Ramme, 1941
 Traulia tonkinensis Bolívar, 1917
 Traulia tristis Ramme, 1941
 Traulia xanthostigma Ramme, 1941
 Traulia xiai Cao, Shi & Yin, 2015
 Traulia yifengensis Wang, Xiangyu & Liu, 1997

Gallery

References

External links
 

Acrididae
Insects of Southeast Asia
Orthoptera of Asia